Jameh Mosque of Marand is a mosque in Marand, East Azerbaijan Province, Iran which was built in the year of 731 AH in the reign of Abu Sa'id Bahadur Khan, according to the Mihrab of the mosque. The Mihrab is located in the southern part of the mosque and is emblazoned with filled with  Quran Āyah And Kufic and Stucco.

References

Mosques in East Azerbaijan Province
Mosque buildings with domes
National works of Iran
Marand